Budy Zosine  is a village in the administrative district of Gmina Jaktorów, within Grodzisk Mazowiecki County, Masovian Voivodeship, in east-central Poland.

The village has a population of 410.

References

Budy Zosine